The VAHAN is an assault rifle of Soviet/Armenian origin and was designed by Engineer and Firearms Designer Vahan S. Manasian. It can be fitted with a GP-30 grenade launcher, bayonet and scope. The weapon dates back to 1952 as the MBC-2 when Manasian was a soldier in the Soviet Army. As of 2009, The VAHAN rifle has not yet been tested by Armenian government.

See also
List of assault rifles

External links
 VAHAN assault rifle on YouTube
 VAHAN assault rifle

5.45×39mm assault rifles
Firearms of Armenia
Armenian inventions